The Road to Coronation Street is a 2010 British drama first broadcast on BBC Four. It is a dramatisation of the creation of Coronation Street, the UK's longest-running television soap opera, from conception to its first transmission in December 1960. Set mainly at Granada Studios, Manchester in 1960, the 75-minute-long programme follows the true story of Tony Warren, a struggling scriptwriter who creates a vision of a television programme depicting normal life in a Salford street of terraced houses. The production first aired in October 2010, and was one of several programmes celebrating the 50th anniversary of Coronation Street that year.

Background
The Road to Coronation Street was written by Daran Little, a long-time archivist on Coronation Street who became a scriptwriter. At the time, however, Little was a scriptwriter for Coronation Streets rival, EastEnders, broadcast on BBC One. Though Coronation Street is and always has been, broadcast on ITV, a competing network, the idea of documenting the show on the anniversary of its half century running was picked up by its natural rival, the BBC. Since the original broadcast, it has been repeated several times on ITV3 and, on the occasion of Tony Warren's death, ITV itself. On 28 June 2020, it was screened on ITV as 'another chance to see', a rare occasion of a BBC-aired show produced by ITV airing on the channel itself.

Casting
The role of Tony Warren, Coronation Streets creator and writer, was given to actor David Dawson. Coronation Streets producer, Canadian-born Harry Elton, was played by Christian McKay. Casting director Margaret Morris and her young assistant Josie Scott, who befriends Warren, were played by Jane Horrocks and Sophia Di Martino, respectively. Derek Bennett, the director, was portrayed by Shaun Dooley, while Sidney Bernstein was played by Steven Berkoff.

Jessie Wallace was given the role of Pat Phoenix, who played Elsie Tanner in Coronation Street. Wallace briefly had sessions with a dialect coach before filming commenced. James Roache plays his father William Roache in the drama. The elder Roache has played Ken Barlow in Coronation Street since its inception. As well as acting in The Road to Coronation Street, James was filming scenes for Coronation Street in a non-regular role as Ken Barlow's grandson, James Cunningham at the same time. Celia Imrie played Doris Speed, who played the character of Annie Walker and Lynda Baron played the role of Violet Carson, who played one of Coronation Streets most iconic characters, Ena Sharples. John Thomson and Michelle Holmes, who had previously been members of the Coronation Street cast, appeared as H.V. Kershaw and Harry Elton's secretary respectively.

Reception
The drama achieved a peak of 852,000 viewers on its first transmission, making it the second most popular programme in BBC Four's history, behind 2008's The Curse of Steptoe at 1.41m viewers. Sam Wollaston, a critic for The Guardian, gave a positive review, stating "The Road to Coronation Street is fond and warm and charming", and stated there were "fine performances" from the entire cast, in particular from David Dawson and Steven Berkoff. Phil Hogan for The Observer also commented on the "superb" quality of acting, and also praised Jessie Wallace personally, saying: "Watching EastEnders star Jessie Wallace storm through her audition as blowsy Street firebrand Elsie Tanner – tearing into her delinquent son Dennis for nicking two bob out of her purse – made the hairs on the back of my neck stand on end." Grace Dent of The Guardian echoed Hogan's comments, saying "Obviously, the star of this show is the sublime Jessie Wallace playing 60s megastar Pat Phoenix, who played Corrie's Elsie Tanner." Jane Simon of the Daily Mirror stated the programme was "a triumph on every level". The Road to Coronation Street was awarded Best Single Drama at the 2011 British Academy Television Awards. Additionally, Jessie Wallace and Lynda Baron were both nominated in the Best Supporting Actress Category for their performances as Pat Phoenix and Violet Carson, respectively, however, Lauren Socha won the award for her role in the E4 series Misfits.The Road to Coronation Street was repeated on 11 December 2020 on ITV3, as part of the 60th Anniversary celebrations of Coronation Street.

Cast
 David Dawson as Tony Warren
 Jessie Wallace as Pat Phoenix
 Celia Imrie as Doris Speed
 Lynda Baron as Violet Carson
 James Roache as William Roache
 Sophia Di Martino as Josie Scott
 Ann Aris as Nita Valerie
 Steven Berkoff as Sidney Bernstein
 Shaun Dooley as Derek Bennett
 Enid Dunn as Agnes
 Henry Goodman as Cecil Bernstein
 Michelle Holmes as Brenda
 Jane Horrocks as Margaret Morris
 Christian McKay as Harry Elton
 Tara Moran as Edna Walker
 Phoebe Nicholls as Mrs Simpson
 John Thomson as Harry Kershaw
 David Williams as Commissionaire

See also
Episode 1 (Coronation Street)

References

External links
 
 

Coronation Street spin-offs
BBC television dramas
Television series based on actual events
Television series set in 1960
BAFTA winners (television series)
2010 television films
2010 films
Films directed by Charles Sturridge
Television series by ITV Studios